Walter Weiler (4 December 1903 – 4 May 1945) was a Swiss footballer who played for Switzerland in the 1934 FIFA World Cup. He also played for Grasshopper Club Zürich. He was also in Switzerland's squads for the 1924 Summer Olympics and the 1928 Summer Olympics football tournaments, and played in the latter.

References

External links
Profile at FIFA.com
Walter Weiler's profile at Sports Reference.com

1903 births
1945 deaths
Swiss men's footballers
Switzerland international footballers
1934 FIFA World Cup players
Association football defenders
Grasshopper Club Zürich players
Footballers at the 1924 Summer Olympics
Olympic medalists in football
Medalists at the 1924 Summer Olympics
Olympic footballers of Switzerland
Olympic silver medalists for Switzerland
Footballers at the 1928 Summer Olympics
People from Winterthur
Sportspeople from the canton of Zürich